The Football Writers' Association (FWA) is an association of football journalists and correspondents writing for English newspapers and agencies. It presents the Footballer of the Year Award, the oldest and most distinguished award given in the domestic game. In 2018, recognising the growth of the woman's game, it announced a Woman's Footballer of the Year Award.

History
The choice to create the Football Writers' Association (FWA) was made on 22 September 1947 by journalists, Charles Buchan (News Chronicle), Frank Coles (Daily Telegraph), Roy Peskett (Daily Mail), and Archie Quick while aboard a boat in the middle of the English Channel that was returning from a football match in which England beat Belgium 5–2. 
Ivan Sharpe of the Sunday Chronicle was appointed chairman a month later, a position he held for the first six years of the FWA's existence and eight times in all in his long career.
The men formalized a few of the newborn association's rules and regulations within one month. Some of the rules initially created were that membership to the FWA would be invitation only and that they would exclusively send invitations to "working journalists who are accredited football correspondents for newspapers and agencies". It was also determined that the Football Writers' Association's headquarters would be in London, England and the membership fee would be five guineas for the first year of membership with a recurring annual payment of two guineas each year after. Furthermore, the men had decided that there would be a vote held annually for all members that would decide the recipient of the prestigious Footballer of the Year Award, which is still today the oldest and most distinguished award given in the domestic game. The award was originally presented at the annual dinner, which was held on the night before the FA Cup Final, but was later changed to the Thursday preceding every FA Cup Final.
To mark the FWA's 70th anniversary newly created Life Members of the association will now receive the Ivan Sharpe Life Membership Award, while in 2018, the FWA announced it was awarding a Woman's Footballer of the Year award in recognition of the growth of the woman's game in this country.
ed

The Football Writers' Association today
The FWA has experienced steady growth since its inception in 1947. Membership has grown to about four-hundred members. Changes in modern journalism have welcomed a more diverse range of members. In recent years, the association has modernized itself by changing the voting process for Footballer of the Year by making online voting available to its members as well as incorporating social media into its revamped web site. The Football Writers' Association continues to recruit new members openly in the same manner as was created by its founders in 1947. On 24 April 2019, beIN Sports senior sports correspondent Carrie Brown was announced as the first female chair of the FWA.

The FWA Footballer of the Year Award
Charles Buchan, one of the founding fathers of the FWA, had originally suggested that there be an award presented "to the professional player who by precept and example is considered by a ballot of members to be the footballer of the year." The award is the oldest and is considered to be the most prestigious award in British football. The award is presented annually. The first player to receive the award was Sir Stanley Matthews in 1948. In 2018 the FWA introduced their award for the Woman Footballer of the Year in recognition of the growth of the woman's game.

Winners
The award has been presented on 71 occasions as of 2018, with 63 different winners. On one occasion two players shared the award for a season (1968–69). The table also indicates where the winning player also won one or more of the other major "player of the year" awards in English football, namely the Professional Footballers' Association's Players' Player of the Year award (PPY), Fans' Player of the Year award (FPY), and Young Player of the Year award (YPY).

The FWA Women's Footballer of the Year Award
In 2018, the FWA introduced their award for the Woman Footballer of the Year in recognition of the growth of the women's game.The award has been presented on one occasion as of 2018, with one winner. The table also indicates where the winning player also won one or more of the other major "player of the year" awards in English football, namely the PFA Women's Players' Player of the Year award (PPY), and the PFA Women's Young Player of the Year award (YPY).

The FWA Tribute Award

The Football Writers' Association Tribute Award is presented annually every January at the Savoy Hotel to the individual that the committee believes to have contributed to the national game in a significant way. The award was first given in 1983 to Ron Greenwood.

See also
Welsh Football Writers Association
Scottish Football Writers' Association
Ice Hockey Journalists UK
Professional Footballers' Association

References

External links
Official website

Journalism-related professional associations
Football mass media in the United Kingdom

Football organisations in England
Sports journalism organizations in Europe
Professional associations based in the United Kingdom
Sports organizations established in 1947
1947 establishments in England